Kevin Staut (born 15 November 1980) is a French equestrian. His specialty is show jumping, either individually or as part of a team. He has received medals at the Show Jumping French Junior Championships, the Show Jumping European Championship for Young Riders, the Show Jumping European Championships, and the Show Jumping World Championships. He placed 34th at the 2012 Summer Olympics and is currently ranked sixth on the FEI Rolex Ranking List.

Staut is recognized as a JustWorld International Rider Ambassador, and frequently donates his time and talent to helping the organization fracture the cycle of poverty for children around the world.

Life

Biography 
Kevin Staut was born 15 November 1980 in Le Chesnay, France. When his mother's horse, Apollon, retired in Normandy, he became immediately fascinated in horseback riding. When Staut was in his fifth year of secondary school, he left the school system to follow correspondence courses. In 1996, he left to stay with Michael Hécart and received an opportunity to ride "some top-quality horses".

In 2000, Staut won the gold medal at the Show Jumping European Championship for Young Riders on the horse Crocodile Man and then went on to work with Hubert Bourdy for a year and a half. In July 2007, Staut, the newest member of the French national equestrian team, went to Aachen, Germany, where his team placed tenth. Soon after, he was selected again for the team to be a part for the European Championships in Mannheim, Germany.

On 30 August 2009, Staut won the gold prize at the Show Jumping European Championships for individual jumping. The next year he was part of the Show Jumping World Championships, where his team ranked second. When he went back to the European Championships, his team ranked second again. At the 2012 Summer Olympics, Staut advanced to Round A of the final round for individual jumping, where he ended in thirty-fourth place on Silvana. Staut was also part of the French team for team jumping, where the team ranked twelfth and Staut personally received four faults. He was later named the President of the International Jumping Riders Club.

Personal life 
Staut enjoys reading Dan Brown and Guillaume Musso. He also watches DVDs, as he has little time for going to a cinema, and particularly enjoys horror films and Clint Eastwood movies.

Team 
Kevin Staut's equestrian team includes Laurence Gazel, Frédéric Bouvard, Clémence Jourlin (Riders International Management Company), Vincent Goudin (veterinarian), Dimitri Vandormael (smith), Pierre-Henri Renault (smith), and Kevin Blanco (cavalier).

Horses

References

External links 
  

French male equestrians
Olympic equestrians of France
1980 births
Living people
Equestrians at the 2012 Summer Olympics
Equestrians at the 2016 Summer Olympics
People from Le Chesnay
Olympic gold medalists for France
Olympic medalists in equestrian
Medalists at the 2016 Summer Olympics
Sportspeople from Yvelines